Yi-Nin Lee (1914-1950) was a Chinese actress from Hong Kong. Lee is credited with over 40 films.

Early life 
In 1914, Lee was born.

Career 
In 1935, Lee joined Grandview Film Company and became an actress in Hong Kong films. Lee first appeared as Wan Ying in Yesterday's Song (aka Voice of the Broken-hearted), a 1935 Drama film directed by Chiu Shu-San. Lee was known for her appearance as a lead actress in Cantonese Drama, Comedy, Crime, Romance, and War films in 1930s to 1940s. In War films, Lee appeared as Luk Mo-Jing in The Light of Women, a 1937 War film directed by Go Lee-Han, and appeared as Ma Pik-Chu in Incident in the Pacific, a 1938 War film directed by Hou Yao. Lee's last film was A Moral Hooker, a 1949 Drama film. Lee is credited with over 40 films.

Filmography

Films 
This is a partial list of films.
 1935 Yesterday's Song (aka Voice of the Broken-hearted) - Wan Ying 
 1937 The Light of Women - Luk Mo-Jing 
 1938 Incident in the Pacific - Ma Pik-Chu 
 1948 The Lusty Thief Girl - Mary.
 1949 A Moral Hooker

Personal life 
On November 4, 1950, Lee died.

References

External links 
 Li Qinian at dianying.com

1914 births
1950 deaths
Hong Kong film actresses